Smithy (also known as Southern Cross in the UK and Pacific Adventure in the US) is a 1946 Australian adventure film about pioneering Australian aviator Sir Charles Kingsford Smith and his 1928 flight across the Pacific Ocean, from San Francisco, California, United States to Brisbane, Queensland, Australia. This was the first-ever transpacific flight. Kingsford Smith was the pilot of the Fokker F.VII/3m three-engine monoplane "Southern Cross", with Australian aviator Charles Ulm as the relief pilot.  The other two crew members were Americans James Warner and Harry Lyon.

Plot
In 1943 in the South-West Pacific, some Australian and American airmen discuss the story of "Smithy", Charles Kingsford Smith. The Americans are told the story by an old officer of Smithy, along with a waiter, Stringer, who knew him.

The story starts in 1917 with his recovering from a wound incurred in fighting over the Western Front. Kingsford Smith is rewarded with the Military Cross and is determined to make a career out of flying.

After the war Kingsford Smith visits America and has a brief romance with Kay Sutton but later falls in love with and marries Mary Powell.

He attempts to enter the England to Australia Air Race in 1919 but is stopped by Prime Minister Billy Hughes. Kingsford Smith then decides to become the first person to fly from the United States to Australia across the Pacific. He does the trip with Charles Ulm in an aircraft called the Southern Cross and becomes world-famous.

Kingsford Smith attempts to set up his own airline but is not successful and is forced to take people on joy flights to make a living. He breaks another record, crossing the Pacific from the Australia to the United States in a single engine aircraft with P.G. Taylor. Kingsford Smith almost dies flying to New Zealand with Bill Taylor and John Stannage, and subsequently, retires the Southern Cross.

In 1935 Kingsford Smith attempts to fly from Australia to England but disappears over the Indian Ocean.

Cast

 Ron Randell as Charles Kingsford Smith
 Muriel Steinbeck as Mary Powell
 John Tate as Charles Ulm
 Joy Nichols as Kay Sutton
 Nan Taylor as Nan Kingsford Smith
 John Dunne as Harold Kingsford Smith
 Alec Kellaway as Captain Alan Hancock
 John Dease as Sir Hubert Wilkins
 Marshall Crosby as Arthur Powell
 Edward Smith as Beau Sheil
 Alan Herbert as Tommy Pethybridge
 John Fleeting as Keith Anderson
 Joe Valli as Stringer
 G.J. Montgomery-Jackson as Warner
 Gundy Hill as Lyon
 William Morris Hughes as himself
 Captain P.G. Taylor as himself
 John Stannage as himself
 Bud Tingwell as an RAAF control tower officer

Development

Conception
Smithy was the idea of N.P. Pery, the managing director of Columbia Pictures in Australia. The Australian government had restricted the export of capital during the war, and Pery thought making a film could use up some of that money. Pery was quoted as saying "I do not think I am indulging in Utopian fancies when I say that Australia, or rather, some spot in Australia, could be made the Hollywood of the British Commonwealth."
Pery approached Ken G. Hall, who was Australia's most commercially successful director, and asked him to make a film about an Australian who was well known internationally. Hall wrote that he briefly considered Don Bradman but dismissed the idea because Bradman was not known in the United States. The three main candidates were Ned Kelly, Dame Nellie Melba and Charles Kingsford Smith. Hall said he decided against Kelly because too many films had been made about him. Melba was rejected because of the costs involved with producing opera sequences and the difficulty of finding an appropriate singer to stand in for Melba. That left Kingsford Smith, who appealed in part because of his connection to the United States.

Scripting
Hall commissioned treatments from several writers, including Jesse Lasky, Jr., who was then stationed at Cinesound Productions with the US Signal Corps; Josephine O'Neill, a Sydney film critic; Kenneth Slessor, film critic and poet; and Max Afford, one of Australia's leading playwrights and radio writers. Early drafts focused on Smithy's first flight across the Pacific but then Hall decided to cover most of Smithy's life.

Hall felt Afford's version was the best and the two of them developed a detailed treatment. Afford signed a contract in June 1944.

The treatment was adapted by Alec Coppel, an Australian writer who had enjoyed success in London and returned to Australia during the war. Sydney journalist Norman Ellison provided research.

Casting
Ken G. Hall looked at 60 applicants to play the title role in Smithy, screen testing eight.

Hall claimed the choice came down to Peter Finch and Ron Randell, a radio and theatre actor. Hall preferred Finch but sent extensive screen tests of both actors with Muriel Steinbeck back to Columbia in Hollywood. The studio picked Randell on the grounds of his greater romantic appeal. Muriel Steinbeck later confirmed that Hall wanted Finch but Columbia did not feel he had sufficient "sex appeal." She said that Hall then wanted Dick Bentley but Columbia did not want to cast a comedian. Ron Randell was cast instead.

Muriel Steinbeck was the only actor considered for the female lead in Smithy. She had previously appeared with Randell in A Son is Born, a film whose release was held up to take advantage of publicity for Smithy.

Shooting
Although Smithy was entirely financed by Columbia Pictures, Ken G. Hall made it using his Cinesound crew and shot it mostly at Cinesound's studio in Bondi.

The aircraft used in Smithy was the genuine Southern Cross, which had been purchased by the Australian Government 10 years earlier and refurbished by the RAAF. A surplus RAAF CAC Boomerang was used in flying sequences for Kingsford Smith's Lady Southern Cross Lockheed Altair.

Two former co-pilots of Kingsford Smith, P.G. Taylor and Harry Purvis played themselves, as did former Prime Minister Billy Hughes. Hall says Alec Coppel had written a scene where Kingsford Smith tried to persuade Hughes to let him compete in an air race and Hughes switches off his hearing aid. Hughes was sensitive, however, about his deafness and reference to it was removed in the shooting script.

Smithy featured the first on screen appearance of noted Australian actor Charles "Bud" Tingwell who was cast as a RAAF control tower officer – winning the role as he could supply his own RAAF uniform.

Reception
Smithy had its world premiere at a gala screening in Sydney on 26 June 1946, attended by the cast and crew, the Premier of New South Wales, and Shirley Ann Richards, who was visiting Australia at the time.

Critical
Reviews were generally positive, although not without criticisms.

Writing in 2019, Stephen Vagg described Muriel Steinbeck's "wife" part as "a decent one – she gets to flirt, and worry and fight, and the film improves immeasurably once her character becomes part of the action."

US release
Smithy was released in the United States as Pacific Adventure. The Los Angeles Times noted the film "while technically acceptable is pretty much a stereotype of all the other histories of aviation pioneering... Ron Randell makes a likeable hero."

The New York Times wrote that "... it is unfortunate that the people who made this picture ... did not draw a more exciting and exacting drama out of the colourful career of the noted airman."

The film was not a success in America. Randell later said, "Americans are not sufficiently familiar with the many personalities besides Sir Charles Kingsford-Smith who were depicted in the picture."

Box office
Smithy was the third-most popular film released in Australia in 1946.

Legacy
Pery was keen for Columbia to make further films in Australia. Harry Cohn, head of Columbia, however, was opposed to the idea. He later arranged for Smithy to be drastically re-cut and re-edited for its US release, calling it Pacific Adventure, removing references to Australia, along with Pery's credit.

Cohn did offer Ron Randell a long-term contract in Hollywood, which the actor accepted.

References

Bibliography

 Hall, Ken G. Directed by Ken G. Hall: Autobiography of an Australian Filmmaker. Lansdowne Press, 1977. .
 Harrison, Tony, ed.The Australian Film and Television Companion. Cammeray. New South Wales: Simon & Schuster Australia, 1994. .
 Pike, Andrew and Ross Cooper. Australian Film 1900–1977: A Guide to Feature Film Production. Melbourne: Oxford University Press, 1998. .

External links

Smithy at Australian Screen Online
Smithy at National Film and Sound Archive
'Smithy' movie – Gould Genealogy
Smithy and the Southern Cross – State Library of NSW
Smithy at Oz Movies
Review of Pacific Adventure at Variety
Review of Smithy at Variety

1946 films
1940s English-language films
1940s adventure films
Australian aviation films
Films directed by Ken G. Hall
Columbia Pictures films
Australian adventure films
Australian black-and-white films
1940s Australian films